Kenneth Barnett is a Jamaican cricketer. He played four first-class matches for Jamaica between 1965 and 1966.

References

External links
 

Year of birth missing (living people)
Living people
Jamaican cricketers
Jamaica cricketers
Place of birth missing (living people)